Kajang is a town in the state of Selangor in Malaysia.

Kajang may also refer to:

Kajang (Indonesia), district in the Indonesian province of South Sulawesi
Kajang (dish), a kind of satay